Montchevreuil is a commune in the Oise department in northern France. It was established on 1 January 2019 by merger of the former communes of Fresneaux-Montchevreuil (the seat) and Bachivillers.

See also
 Communes of the Oise department

References

Communes of Oise
Communes nouvelles of Oise
2019 establishments in France
Populated places established in 2019